The Brown University Standard Corpus of Present-Day American English (or just Brown Corpus) is an electronic collection of text samples of American English, the first major structured corpus of varied genres. This corpus first set the bar for the scientific study of the frequency and distribution of word categories in everyday language use. Compiled by Henry Kučera and W. Nelson Francis at Brown University, in Rhode Island, it is a general language corpus containing 500 samples of English, totaling roughly one million words, compiled from works published in the United States in 1961.

History
In 1967, Kučera and Francis published their classic work Computational Analysis of Present-Day American English, which provided basic statistics on what is known today simply as the Brown Corpus.

The Brown Corpus was a carefully compiled selection of current American English, totalling about a million words drawn from a wide variety of sources. Kučera and Francis subjected it to a variety of computational analyses, from which they compiled a rich and variegated opus, combining elements of linguistics, psychology, statistics, and sociology. It has been very widely used in computational linguistics, and was for many years among the most-cited resources in the field.

Shortly after publication of the first lexicostatistical analysis, Boston publisher Houghton-Mifflin approached Kučera to supply a million word, three-line citation base for its new American Heritage Dictionary. This ground-breaking new dictionary, which first appeared in 1969, was the first dictionary to be compiled using corpus linguistics for word frequency and other information.

The initial Brown Corpus had only the words themselves, plus a location identifier for each. Over the following several years part-of-speech tags were applied. The Greene and Rubin tagging program (see under part of speech tagging) helped considerably in this, but the high error rate meant that extensive manual proofreading was required.

The tagged Brown Corpus used a selection of about 80 parts of speech, as well as special indicators for compound forms, contractions, foreign words and a few other phenomena, and formed the model for many later corpora such as the Lancaster-Oslo-Bergen Corpus (British English from the early 1990s) and the Freiburg-Brown Corpus of American English (FROWN) (American English from the early 1990s). Tagging the corpus enabled far more sophisticated statistical analysis, such as the work programmed by Andrew Mackie, and documented in books on English grammar.

One interesting result is that even for quite large samples, graphing words in order of decreasing frequency of occurrence shows a hyperbola: the frequency of the n-th most frequent word is roughly proportional to 1/n. Thus "the" constitutes nearly 7% of the Brown Corpus, "to" and "of" more than another 3% each; while about half the total vocabulary of about 50,000 words are hapax legomena: words that occur only once in the corpus. This simple rank-vs.-frequency relationship was noted for an extraordinary variety of phenomena by George Kingsley Zipf (for example, see his The Psychobiology of Language), and is known as Zipf's law.

Although the Brown Corpus pioneered the field of corpus linguistics, by now typical corpora (such as the Corpus of Contemporary American English, the British National Corpus or the International Corpus of English) tend to be much larger, on the order of 100 million words.

Sample distribution 

The Corpus consists of 500 samples, distributed across 15 genres in rough proportion to the amount published in 1961 in each of those genres. All works sampled were published in 1961; as far as could be determined they were first published then, and were written by native speakers of American English.

Each sample began at a random sentence-boundary in the article or other unit chosen, and continued up to the first sentence boundary after 2,000 words. In a very few cases miscounts led to samples being just under 2,000 words.

The original data entry was done on upper-case only keypunch machines; capitals were indicated by a preceding asterisk, and various special items such as formulae also had special codes.

The corpus originally (1961) contained 1,014,312 words sampled from 15 text categories:
 A. PRESS: Reportage (44 texts)
 Political
 Sports
 Society
 Spot News
 Financial
 Cultural
 B. PRESS: Editorial (27 texts)
 Institutional Daily
 Personal
 Letters to the Editor
 C. PRESS: Reviews (17 texts)
 theatre
 books
 music
 dance
 D. RELIGION (17 texts)
 Books
 Periodicals
 Tracts
 E. SKILL AND HOBBIES (36 texts)
 Books
 Periodicals
 F. POPULAR LORE (48 texts)
 Books
 Periodicals
 G. BELLES-LETTRES - Biography, Memoirs, etc. (75 texts)
 Books
 Periodicals
 H. MISCELLANEOUS: US Government & House Organs (30 texts)
 Government Documents
 Foundation Reports
 Industry Reports
 College Catalog
 Industry House organ
 J. LEARNED (80 texts)
 Natural Sciences
 Medicine
 Mathematics
 Social and Behavioral Sciences
 Political Science, Law, Education
 Humanities
 Technology and Engineering
 K. FICTION: General (29 texts)
 Novels
 Short Stories
 L. FICTION: Mystery and Detective Fiction (24 texts)
 Novels
 Short Stories
 M. FICTION: Science (6 texts)
 Novels
 Short Stories
 N. FICTION: Adventure and Western (29 texts)
 Novels
 Short Stories
 P. FICTION: Romance and Love Story (29 texts)
 Novels
 Short Stories
 R. HUMOR (9 texts)
 Novels
 Essays, etc.

Part-of-speech tags used

See also
 LOB Corpus, a corpus of British English based on the same parameters as the Brown Corpus
 British National Corpus

References

External links
 Brown Corpus Manual

 Download the Brown Corpus
 Search, via Sketch Engine, in the Brown Corpus Annotated by the TreeTagger v2
 More details on the Brown Corpus tagset
 Python software for convenient access to the Brown Corpus
 PHP (Part Of Speech Tagging)

English corpora
Brown University
Applied linguistics
Linguistic research
1961 works
Corpora